The 1931 Professional Squash Rackets Championship of Great Britain saw Don Butcher defend his title against Charles Arnold. The first leg was held at Butcher's home club the Conservative Club on 9 November and he defeated Arnold in just eighteen minutes. The first game lasted just three and a half minutes. The second leg was held at the Bath Club on 16 November, the home club of Arnold but once again Butcher ran out an easy winner.

Results

First Leg

Second Leg

References

Men's British Open Squash Championships
Men's British Open Squash Championship
Men's British Open Squash Championship
Men's British Open Squash Championship
Men's British Open Squash Championship
Squash competitions in London